Marcelino Saavedra is a former paralympic athlete from Spain who competed mainly in category C5-8 4 × 100 m events.

Saavedra competed in both the 1992 Summer Paralympics in his home country and the 1996 Summer Paralympics.  In 1992, he competed in the 100m and 200m finishing fourth in both events, he was also part of the silver medal-winning Spanish squad in the 4 × 100 m.  At the 1996 games he competed in the 100m and 400m finishing fourth and fifth respectively, he was also part of the Spanish squad that failed to finished in the 4 × 100 m.

References

External links
 

Paralympic athletes of Spain
Athletes (track and field) at the 1992 Summer Paralympics
Paralympic silver medalists for Spain
Spanish male sprinters
Living people
Medalists at the 1992 Summer Paralympics
Year of birth missing (living people)
Paralympic medalists in athletics (track and field)